Linda Kohen (born 28 October 1923) is an Italian-born Uruguayan painter with a long international career.

Biography
In 1939, faced with the rejection of Italian racial laws for them, Kohen left Italy with her family and moved to South America. They lived in Buenos Aires and São Paulo and in 1940, the family settled in Uruguay, where Linda began her career. She studied drawing with Pierre Fossay and painting at Taller Torres Garcia with Augusto Torres, José Gurvich and Julio Alpuy. She also went through the workshops of Eduardo Vernazza and Horacio Butler in Buenos Aires. In 1946, she married Rafael Kohen, adopted his surname and they settled in Buenos Aires until 1948. In 1971, she held her first solo exhibition at the Moretti Gallery in Montevideo and then numerous more followed in Punta del Este, Buenos Aires, São Paulo, Miami, Washington, D.C., Vicenza, etc.

Work
Kohen's paintings are intimate in nature, they carry an almost autobiographical tone, numerous subjective self-portraits where her skirt, hands or legs are protagonists, her image reflected in mirrors, details of her house and everyday objects, offer a subjective view of immediate reality of the artist. Even when she paints landscapes, she does it from her window, and she keeps her reference to it, as a way of suggesting the scale of it and highlighting her gaze. Her work is serene, inviting introspection, with a muted palette and stripped composition, it refers in a certain way to the metaphysical character of the work of Giorgio Morandi (1890-1964).

References

1923 births
Living people
Painters from Milan
Italian emigrants to Uruguay
20th-century Uruguayan painters
Uruguayan women painters